Super Dark Times is a 2017 American independent psychological thriller film directed by Kevin Phillips and starring Owen Campbell, Charlie Tahan, and Elizabeth Cappuccino. It is Phillips' directorial debut. After a traumatic accident, an inseparable pair of teenage boys and best friends lose their innocence from jealousy, violence and paranoia.

Plot
In the 1990s, in Upstate New York, two teenage best friends, Zach and Josh, rate the girls in their yearbook. They find a common interest in Allison.

After school, the duo crosses the path of the universally-disliked Daryl and his eighth-grade friend Charlie. Later that week, the four boys meet up at Josh's house where they look through the possessions of Josh's brother, who is away in the military, and find a bag of marijuana and a katana.

Afterwards, the boys play with the sword in a secluded park area bordering the local cemetery and notice that Daryl has stolen the marijuana. After a tense argument, Josh and Daryl fight, resulting in Daryl being accidentally stabbed in the neck with the katana. Daryl runs from the scene but only makes it into the adjacent forest where he dies. The boys panic and hide both Daryl's body and the weapon.

At school, rumors circulate about Daryl's disappearance. Zach has nightmares and Josh doesn't attend classes. Zach wants to return to Daryl's burial site and attend Allison's upcoming party with Josh, who declines but goes to Allison's party separately where he shares his brother's weed. Zach, disturbed, leaves.

Another student, John, is found dead. Rumors speculate that he fell off a bridge. Zach suspects that John's death was not accidental. He returns to Daryl's burial site and finds the katana missing and Daryl's corpse mutilated.

Zach goes to Josh's home and realizes Josh is with Allison. He tracks her to Meghan's house, where Josh has killed her with the katana and tied Allison up. After Zach unties her, the former friends fight until a neighbor intervenes and subdues Josh, who is arrested, while Zach's fate is left unknown.

Months later, Allison has recovered and returns to school. A camera shot shows three parallel lines on the back of her neck.

Cast
Owen Campbell as Zach Taylor 
Charlie Tahan as Josh Templeton
Elizabeth Cappuccino as Allison Bannister
Max Talisman as Daryl Harper
Sawyer Barth as Charlie Barth
Amy Hargreaves as Karen Taylor
Adea Lennox as Meghan
Ethan Botwick as John Whitcomb
Anni Krueger as Mrs. Barron
Kortnee Simmons as Eugene
Casey Sullivan as Senior

Release
The film premiered at the Rotterdam Film Festival. It made its North American premiere on April 20, 2017, at the Tribeca Film Festival. Deadline Hollywood reported that The Orchard had acquired worldwide distribution rights to the film in March 2017. The film was released in theaters on September 29, 2017, and digitally on October 3, 2017. It plays on Hulu streaming.

Reception

The film has a 90% approval rating on Rotten Tomatoes based on 48 reviews, with an average rating of 7.30/10. The site's critics consensus reads: "Rich in atmosphere and period detail, Super Dark Times is an effective teen thriller whose true power lies in its approach to deeper themes." Metacritic reports a score of 75/100 based on 18 critics, indicating "generally favorable reviews".

David Ehrlich of IndieWire graded the film a B−.

Awards and nominations
Super Dark Times won the best feature film award at the 17th Neuchâtel International Fantastic Film Festival. It was also the winner of Best Sound Design in a Feature Film at the 2017 Music+Sound Awards, and received a nomination for the Saturn Award for Best Independent Film at the 44th Saturn Awards. At the 33rd Independent Spirit Awards, Kevin Phillips was nominated for the Someone to Watch Award.

See also 
 I Am Not a Serial Killer
 Summer of 84

References

External links
 
 

2017 films
2010s psychological drama films
2017 thriller drama films
2017 psychological thriller films
American psychological thriller films
American independent films
American coming-of-age films
Films set in 1996
Films about missing people
Films about murder
Films about murderers
Films produced by Ben Collins (writer)
Films produced by Luke Piotrowski
Films with screenplays by Ben Collins (writer)
Films with screenplays by Luke Piotrowski
Juvenile sexuality in films
Films about child death
Films about sleep
2017 directorial debut films
2017 drama films
2017 independent films
2010s English-language films
2010s American films